Sir George Suttie, 3rd Baronet (12 October 1715 – 25 November 1783), of Balgone House, Haddington, was a Scottish politician.

He was the eldest son of Sir James Suttie, 2nd Baronet, whom he succeeded in 1736.

He was a Member of Parliament (MP) for Haddingtonshire from 1768 to May 1777.

He died in 1783, having married Agnes, the daughter and coheiress of William Grant, Lord Prestongrange, They had 3 sons and 5 daughters.

References

1715 births
1783 deaths
People from Haddington, East Lothian
Baronets in the Baronetage of Nova Scotia
Members of the Parliament of Great Britain for Scottish constituencies
British MPs 1768–1774
British MPs 1774–1780
32nd Regiment of Foot officers